Ectoedemia permira is a moth of the family Nepticulidae. It was described by R.K. Puplesis in 1984. It is known from the Russian Far East and China.

The larvae feed on Hypericum attenuatum.

References

Nepticulidae
Moths of Asia
Moths described in 1984